Walter Hudson (June 5, 1944 – December 24, 1991) was the holder of the Guinness World Record for the largest waist.

Daily diet

Hudson described his average daily diet as consisting of two boxes of sausages,  of bacon, 12 eggs, and a loaf of bread for breakfast, four hamburgers, four double cheeseburgers and five large portions of fries for lunch, and three large ham steaks or two chickens, four baked potatoes, four sweet potatoes, four heads of broccoli, and most of a large cake for dinner. He also had additional snacks, and drank an average of 237 oz / 1.9 gallon / 7 liters of soda every day.

Death 
Walter Hudson died of a heart attack at his home on December 24, 1991, at age 46. Emergency rescuers from the Hempstead Fire Department cut a  hole in the bedroom wall to remove his body from the premises.

See also
 List of the heaviest people
 Obesity

Sources

1944 births
1991 deaths
People from Hempstead (village), New York